"Aedh Wishes for the Cloths of Heaven" is a poem by William Butler Yeats. It was published in 1899 in his third volume of poetry, The Wind Among the Reeds.

Commentary

The speaker of the poem is the character Aedh, who appears in Yeats's work alongside two other archetypal characters of the poet's myth: Michael Robartes and Red Hanrahan. The three are collectively known as the principles of the mind. (The character "Aedh" is replaced in volumes of Yeats's collected poetry by a more generic "he".)

Allusions

The poem was used in the films Equilibrium, 84 Charing Cross Road and the Korean film Dasepo Naughty Girls. The poem is recited by the character Brendan in the final episode of season 3 of the BBC series Ballykissangel. In Flagrante, a photographic book by Chris Killip, opens with the poem. John Irving uses the poem in the book A Widow for One Year. It is a recurrent metaphor in the relationship between a father and son in William Nicholson's novel The Secret Intensity of Everyday Life.

Text

Musical settings

A musical setting of this poem is included in YEATS SONGS, a song cycle composed by Richard B. Evans.

The first movement of John Tavener's song cycle To a Child Dancing in the Wind is a setting of this poem .

The poem was set to music by Virginia Astley on the title track of her 1996 album Had I The Heavens.

The poem has been set to music by composers Thomas Dunhill, Alan Bullard, under the title "Tread Softly" and Z. Randall Stroope.

A slightly modified version of the poem also appears on the 1991 album Spin by Dave Stewart and Barbara Gaskin (Rykodisc RCD 20213 / MIDI Records (1991)).

A slightly modified version of the poem also features in the track "Birthday" on the 2009 album No Hassle by Tosca.

A setting of this poem is featured on Dancing In The Wind, a set of W.B. Yeats poems set to songs and harp music by Claire Roche.

The Cranberries cite the last sentence of the poem in the song "Delilah" from their album Bury the Hatchet.

Black Rebel Motorcycle Club cites the last sentence of the poem in the song "Promise".

A musical setting of this poem appears on the 2006 debut album of the North Sea Radio Orchestra, along with He Gives His Beloved Certain Rhymes.

The French band Elephanz composed the Yeats-inspired "Walk on my dreams" on their debut album Time for a Change. The song's chorus: "I spread at your feet, The best part of my dreams, You'd better watch out where you walk. I hope, I hope you could walk the slowest, You walk on my dreams"

Hollie Fullbrook, Tiny Ruins, and Hamish Kilgour included "Tread Softly", a musical setting of "Aedh Wishes for the Cloths of Heaven", on their 2015 EP titled Hurtling Through.

See also
 1899 in poetry

References

External links
 

Poetry by W. B. Yeats
1899 poems